Para-archery has been contested at every Summer Paralympic Games since they were first held in 1960. Separate individual and team events are held for men and women. Archers are classified according to the extent of their disability, with separate individual events for each of three classes.
 
W1 - Wheelchair and Cerebral Palsy athletes with impairment in all four limbs 
W2 - Wheelchair users with full arm function. 
W3 - Standing athletes in Amputee, Les Autres and Cerebral Palsy categories. Some athletes in the standing group will sit on a high stool for support but will still have their feet touching the ground.

Summary

Medal summary
Overall results, updated to the 2020 Summer Paralympics.

Multi medalists
List of archers who have won at least two gold medals or five medals in archery. Active archers are in bold.

Nations

See also
Archery at the Summer Olympics
World Para Archery Championships

References

 
Paralympic Games
Archery